Taman Paramount LRT station is an LRT station in Petaling Jaya that is served by rapidKL's Kelana Jaya Line. This station is located in Taman Paramount, Petaling Jaya, Selangor, Malaysia.

Neighbourhoods surrounding the station include Sections 14, 20, 21 and 22 as well as Kampung Tunku in section SS1 Petaling Jaya.

See also

 List of rail transit stations in Klang Valley

Kelana Jaya Line
Railway stations opened in 1998